Chalenata is a genus of moths of the family Noctuidae. The genus was erected by Francis Walker in 1864.

Species
Chalenata bilinia (Schaus, 1904) Brazil (São Paulo)
Chalenata fumosa (Butler, 1879) Brazil (Amazonas)
Chalenata lilacina Hampson, 1910 Argentina (Gran Chaco)
Chalenata mesonephele Hampson, 1910 Argentina
Chalenata micaceella Walker, 1864 Brazil (Tefé)
Chalenata noxia Schaus, 1911 Costa Rica
Chalenata quella (Dyar, 1914) Panama
Chalenata ustata Druce, 1909 Colombia
Chalenata ustatina Dyar, 1914 Panama

References

Acontiinae
Monotypic moth genera